Human Brain Mapping is a peer-reviewed scientific journal published by John Wiley & Sons covering research on human brain mapping.

According to the Journal Citation Reports, the journal has a 2014 impact factor of 5.969, ranking it second out of 14 journals in the category "Neuroimaging", fifth out of 125 journals in the category "Radiology Nuclear Medicine & Medical Imaging", and 27th out of 252 journals in the category "Neuroscience".

References

External links 
 

Neuroimaging journals
Monthly journals
Wiley (publisher) academic journals
Publications established in 1993
English-language journals